Nouadhibou is a department in Dakhlet Nouadhibou Region in Mauritania.

References 

Departments of Mauritania